Elisabet Wittfooth née Tottie (1716, Stockholm - 1791, Åbo) was a Finnish merchant and shipowner.

Elisabet Wittfooth was the daughter of the tobacco factory owner Thomas Tottie (d. 1724) and Christina Schönman in Stockholm, and moved to Åbo in Finland after her marriage in 1737 to the Finnish merchant shipowner Gustaf Adolf Wittfooth (d. 1758). The couple had three sons, Arvid, Adam and Thomas.

She managed the Wittfooth Trading Company, which was at that time one of the biggest in Finland, from the death of her late spouse in 1758 until her own death.  She managed import and export and owned seven ships and two factories, a sugar factory and a tobacco factory, which she founded in 1763. It was the second tobacco factory in Åbo, and the first to be successful.  Between 1758 until 1777, she managed the city hall restaurant of Åbo, the Stadskällaren, (for the last seven years in partnership with Anna Elisabeth Baer): she stopped managing it in 1777, but owned the privilege until 1787.  The Stadskällaren was very successful, being the centre of the students and soldiers of Åbo. She had a close cooperation with the merchant Carl Ekenbom, whom she credited in her will for always "assisting" her, and whom she named guardian of her middle son Adam.

Wittfooth was involved in a conflict with her sons, probably because she chose to manage their late father's business rather than giving it to them, despite the fact that her sons were all adults when she was widowed.  Her eldest son Arvid emigrated to France to establish himself there, which created difficulties because of the unstable situation during the French revolution.  Her middle son Adam married and had daughters, but seemed to have suffered from some sort of mental insufficiency, because he was placed under guardianship and deemed unable to manage his own affairs.

During the Theatre War in 1790, the war lugger Tumlaren was gifted to the royal fleet  of King Gustav III of Sweden by a group of female merchants (referred to as 'Merchant Widows') of the city of Åbo, including Anna Elisabeth Baer and Elisabeth Wittfooth.

References

Other sources
 http://www.blf.fi/artikel.php?id=375
 Biografiskt lexikon för Finland 1. Svenska tiden (2008).
 Vainio-Korhonen, Kirsi: Wittfooth, Elisabet. Kansallisbiografia-verkkojulkaisu. Studia Biographica 4. Helsinki: Suomalaisen Kirjallisuuden Seura, 1997- (viitattu 24.5.2018) URN:NBN:fi-fe20051410 ISSN 1799-4349 (Verkkojulkaisu)

1716 births
1791 deaths
18th-century Finnish businesswomen
18th-century Finnish businesspeople
Finnish businesspeople in shipping